"Miss You Nights" is a song written by Dave Townsend and made famous worldwide by Cliff Richard. The song has been recorded by numerous other artists, most notably Westlife, who released it as the second track on a double A-side single in 2003. The Westlife single reached number 3 in the UK singles chart.

Background
Townsend wrote the song in 1974 while his girlfriend was away on holiday. He recorded it on an album for Island Records, but the label shelved the album and decided to recoup part of the cost of the unreleased album through cover deals. Some demo tapes were handed to Bruce Welch of The Shadows who also worked as producer for Cliff Richard and was looking for songs to revitalize his career. Welch immediately recognized it as a hit - "Andrew Powell's string arrangement helped to make it a great love song through its imagery and potent feelings of longing and loneliness". Welch and Cliff recorded it in September 1975. Of the song and its writer Cliff said: "I think it's one of the nicest songs I’ve ever made... when I heard his version it was terrific. He [Townsend] was pleased to have that happen. I mean it could have been anybody and it would have been a hit."

Original release
Cliff Richard released Miss You Nights on 14 November 1975 as the lead single from his studio album I'm Nearly Famous. It entered the British Top 20 and in March 1976, reached #15 in the UK Singles Chart.

Chart performance

Album appearances

Miss You Nights was first included on Richard's 1976 studio album I'm Nearly Famous. As one of Richard's most enduring songs, it has been included on many of his compilation albums. The most notable of these compilation albums and albums with alternative versions are:
1977: 40 Golden Greats
1979: Thank You Very Much (1978 live version)
1981: Love Songs
1983: Dressed for the Occasion (1982 live version with the Royal Philharmonic Orchestra)
1990: From a Distance: The Event box-set edition. An a cappella version with Coro Croz Corona (choir) was included on a single-sided 7" vinyl record.
1994: The Hit List
2005: From a Distance: The Event (1989 live version, but only included on the 2005 re-release containing the full original live concert track-listing)
2008: The 50th Anniversary Album
2015: 75 at 75
2018: Rise Up (original vocals with new backing by the Royal Philharmonic Orchestra)

Cliff Richard 1994 re-release

In 1994, Cliff Richard re-released the song on a double A-side single with "All I Have to Do Is Dream", which was listed first. "All I Have to Do Is Dream", originally by The Everly Brothers was recorded as a live duet with Phil Everly, while "Miss You Nights" is a remix of the 1976 original. The double A-side single reached #14 in the UK singles chart.

Track list:

CD1:
"All I Have to Do Is Dream"
"Miss You Nights"
"When Will I Be Loved"
"Tribute to the Legends - Medley"

CD2:
"All I Have to Do Is Dream"
"Miss You Nights"
"True Love Ways"
"Party Megamix"

Chart performance

Westlife version

Westlife released "Tonight" and "Miss You Nights" together in 2003 as a double A-side single in the United Kingdom (with "Tonight" listed first). However it was "Tonight" rather than "Miss You Nights" that received most of the radio airplay. The single reached number 3 in both the UK and Scotland. In all other countries where the single charted, only "Tonight" is listed as the charting track. In some countries "Miss You Nights" was excluded from the single altogether.

The song was composed in the traditional verse–chorus form in A major and in this rendition Filan, McFadden and Feehily's vocal ranges from the chords of E4 to B5.

Chart performance

Other versions
Cliff Richard also recorded two more versions of the song as duets:
2004: With Elaine Paige, included on her album Centre Stage: The Very Best of Elaine Paige
2005: With G4 on their album G4 & Friends, later also included on Cliff Richard's 2006 album Two's Company - The Duets

Other covers include:
1976: Diane Solomon on her album Mixed Feelings
1977: Marie Osmond on her album This Is the Way That I Feel
1978: Dobie Gray on his album Midnight Diamond
1979: Art Garfunkel on his album Fate for Breakfast
1979: The Nolans on their album Nolan Sisters
1980: Demis Roussos on his album Man of the World
1980: Roger Whittaker on his album You Are My Miracle
1981: Brotherhood of Man on their album 20 Disco Greats / 20 Love Songs
1982: Carl Wayne with Choral Union
1983: Acker Bilk
1990: Johnny Logan & The Jordanaires single from Logan's album Love Songs
1996: Randy VanWarmer on his album Sun, Moon & Stars
2001: Smokie on their album Uncovered Too
2005: Rick Springfield on his album The Day After Yesterday

References

External links
Second Hand Songs: "Miss You Night" song page

1975 singles
1994 singles
Cliff Richard songs
The Nolans songs
EMI Records singles
1974 songs